Goodell Glacier is a glacier about  long flowing east and north from Fletcher Peninsula into the Williams Ice Stream, Antarctica. It was named by the Advisory Committee on Antarctic Names after Janice G. Goodell of the United States Geological Survey, Woods Hole, Massachusetts, a support member of the Glacier Studies Project Team from the early 1990s onwards.

See also
 List of glaciers in the Antarctic
 Glaciology

References

 

Glaciers of Ellsworth Land